Peter Scarlett may refer to:

 Peter Campbell Scarlett (1804–1881), British diplomat
 Peter W.S.Y. Scarlett (1905–1987), British diplomat